The 1990 American South Conference men's basketball tournament was held March 2–4 at the Convocation Center at Arkansas State University in Jonesboro, Arkansas.

 defeated  in the championship game, 48–44, to take home their first American South men's basketball tournament title.

The Privateers did not receive an automatic invitation to the 1990 NCAA Tournament. Instead, they participated in the 1990 NIT.

Format
All six of the conference's founding members participated in the tournament field. They were seeded based on regular season conference records. The top two teams were given byes into the semifinals while the bottom four teams were placed and paired into the initial quarterfinal round.

All games were played at the Convocation Center in Jonesboro, Arkansas.

Bracket

References

American South Conference men's basketball tournament
1989–90 American South Conference men's basketball season
1990 in sports in Arkansas